Pyotr Petrovich Zaychenko (1 April 1943 – 21 March 2019) was a Soviet-born Russian film and theater actor.

Career
Fame in cinema brought Zaychenko the role of Sgt. Ivan Pukhov in Vadim Abdrashitov's Planet Parade (1984). Later, the actor starred in two more films by this director: Plumbum, or The Dangerous Game and Armavir.

In 1990, Zaychenko played Ivan Shlykov in Pavel Lungin's Taxi Blues.

He was director of the Volgograd branch of the Union of Cinematographers of the Russian Federation.

Selected filmography
Planet Parade (1984) as Ivan Pukhov
Attempted Electrification (1985) as  Shcherbakov
Plumbum, or The Dangerous Game (1987) as druzhinnik
Taxi Blues (1990) as Shlykov
The Tale of the Outstanding Moon (1990) as Vasily Vasilievich
Armavir (1991) as Arthur
Lost in Siberia (1991) as investigator
Stalin's Testament (1993) as general, presidential candidate
Krapachuk (1993) as Chelorek
Concerto for Fats (1995) as Pronin
Crusader (1995) as drug trafficker Tosha
A Moslem (1995) as Pavel Petrovich
The Circus Burned Down, and the Clowns Have Gone (1998) as Igor, businessman
Wolfhound (2006) as Fitela
Free Floating (2006) as Elderly man from brigade
Last Slaughter (2007) as  Anatoly
Taras Bulba (2008) as Metelitsa
Home (2011) as Alexey Shamanov
Siberia, Monamour (2011) as grandfather Ivan
Leningrad 46 (2014) as the old man near the temple
Sophia (2016) as Philip I, metropolitan of Moscow and All Russia

Awards 
 Medal "For Labour Valour" (1986)
 Merited Artist of the Russian Federation (1998)
 Order of Friendship (2014)

References

External links
 
  Пётр Зайченко at the rusactors.ru
  Pyotr Zaychenko on KinoPoisk

1943 births
2019 deaths
People from Volgograd Oblast
Russian male actors
Soviet male actors
Honored Artists of the Russian Federation